Nicklaus Michael Madrigal (born March 5, 1997) is an American professional baseball second baseman for the Chicago Cubs of Major League Baseball (MLB). He previously played for the Chicago White Sox. He made his MLB debut in 2020.

Amateur career
Madrigal attended Elk Grove High School in Elk Grove, California, where he was teammates with Dylan Carlson. In 2015, his senior year, he batted .449 with 28 stolen bases. He was drafted by the Cleveland Indians in the 17th round of the 2015 Major League Baseball draft. He did not sign with the Indians and attended Oregon State University where he played college baseball for the Beavers.

As a freshman at Oregon State, Madrigal started in 49 games and hit .333/.380/.456 with one home run and 29 runs batted in (RBIs). He was named the Pac-12 Freshman of the Year and was a first team All-Pac-12 selection. In 2017, Madrigal's sophomore year, he batted .380 with four home runs and forty RBIs in sixty games and was named the Pac-12 Player of the Year. He was also named to the College World Series All-Tournament Team. In 2018, as a junior, he slashed .367/.428/.511 with three home runs and 34 RBIs in 42 games.

Professional career
Madrigal was selected fourth overall by the Chicago White Sox in the 2018 Major League Baseball draft. He signed for $6,411,400, and was assigned to the Arizona League White Sox before being promoted to the Kannapolis Intimidators in July and the Winston-Salem Dash in August. In 43 games between the three clubs, Madrigal slashed .303/.353/.348 with 16 RBIs and eight stolen bases. He returned to Winston-Salem to begin 2019 and was promoted to the Double-A Birmingham Barons in June after slashing .272/.346/.377 with 52 hits, 20 runs scored, and 17 stolen bases in 49 games with the team. Madrigal was named to the 2019 All-Star Futures Game. After the 2019 MLB Trade Deadline, he was promoted to the Triple-A Charlotte Knights.

Chicago White Sox
On July 31, 2020, Madrigal was promoted to the MLB. He started at second base and batted ninth against the Kansas City Royals. He went 0-for-3. On August 4, Madrigal suffered a separated shoulder while sliding into third base during a game against the Milwaukee Brewers. The next day he was placed on the injured list. Overall with the 2020 Chicago White Sox, Madrigal batted .340 with no home runs and 11 RBIs in 29 games.

Madrigal underwent surgery to repair his separated shoulder following the 2020 season.

On April 24, 2021, Madrigal got his first walk-off hit in his major league career in the bottom of the ninth inning against the Texas Rangers off of pitcher John King, leading the White Sox to a 2-1 win. On May 17, 2021, Madrigal hit his first major league home run off of J. A. Happ of the Minnesota Twins. Madrigal hit .305/.349/.425 with 2 home runs and 21 RBI in 54 games. He was the team leader in hits with 61 until June 9, when he suffered a proximal tear of his right hamstring. He was placed on the 60-day injured list the following day. 
On June 15, the Chicago White Sox announced on Twitter that Madrigal had undergone surgery to repair the hamstring and  would miss the remainder of the 2021 season.

Chicago Cubs
On July 30, 2021, Madrigal was traded along with Codi Heuer to the Chicago Cubs for Craig Kimbrel.

On January 13, 2023, Madrigal agreed to a one-year, $1.225 million contract with the Cubs, avoiding salary arbitration.

Personal life
His twin brother, Ty, played college baseball at Saint Mary's College of California. He signed with the White Sox as an undrafted free agent on June 16, 2020.

References

External links

Oregon State Beavers bio

1997 births
Living people
Arizona League White Sox players
Baseball players from Sacramento, California
Birmingham Barons players
Charlotte Knights players
Chicago Cubs players
Chicago White Sox players
Kannapolis Intimidators players
Major League Baseball second basemen
Oregon State Beavers baseball players
Winston-Salem Dash players